The  is a Japanese poem.  Originally the poem was attributed to the founder of the Shingon Esoteric sect of Buddhism in Japan, Kūkai, but more modern research has found the date of composition to be later in the Heian period (794–1179). The first record of its existence dates from 1079. It is famous because it is a perfect pangram, containing each character of the Japanese syllabary exactly once. Because of this, it is also used as an ordering for the syllabary, in the same way as the A, B, C, D... sequence of the Latin alphabet.

Text
It was also written in man'yōgana.
以呂波耳本部止
千利奴流乎和加
餘多連曽津祢那
良牟有為能於久
耶万計不己衣天
阿佐伎喩女美之
恵比毛勢須

Structurally, however, the poem follows the standard 7–5 pattern of Japanese poetry (with one hypometric line), and in modern times it is generally written that way, in contexts where line breaks are used. The text of the poem in hiragana (with archaic  and  but without voiced consonant marks) is:

Note that:
Modern writing uses voiced consonant marks (with dakuten). This is used as an indicator of sound changes in the spoken Japanese language in the Heian era.
Due to phonological changes over history, the pangram poem no longer matches today's pronunciation of modern kana.
The syllable e (spelt  & ) and ye had merged into  in the 10th century, slightly before the poem was written down in 1079.
 Note 1: The verb form  ("being intoxicated; intoxication") may be read in modern kana pronunciation as either ei, the archaic pronunciation based on the original kana spelling  (wefi in Classical Japanese), or as yoi, the modern reading after sound changes caused the base verb form eu to shift to you.  The difference in reading depends on the intention of the rendering: keeping closer to the original, or keeping closer to modern usage.

An English translation by Professor Ryuichi Abe reads as:

Komatsu Hideo has revealed that the last syllable of each line of the Man'yō-gana original, when put together, reveals a hidden sentence, toka [=toga] nakute shisu, which means "to die without wrong-doing". It is thought that this might be a eulogy in praise of Kūkai, further supporting the notion that the Iroha was written after Kūkai's death.

Usage
For this reason, the poem was frequently used as an ordering of the kana until the Meiji era reforms in the 19th century. Around 1890, with the publication of the Wakun no Shiori and Genkai dictionaries, the gojūon (literally "fifty sounds") ordering system, which is based on Sanskrit, became more common. It begins with a, i, u, e, o then ka, ki, ku... and so on for each kana used in Japanese. Although the earliest known copy of the gojūon predated the Iroha, gojūon was considered too scholarly and had not been widely used.

Even after widespread use of gojūon in education and dictionaries, the Iroha sequence was commonly used as a system of showing order, similarly to a, b, c... in English. For example, Imperial Japanese Navy submarines during the Second World War had official designations beginning with I (displacement 1,000 tonnes or more), Ro (500 to 999 tonnes), and Ha (less than 500 tonnes).  Also, Japanese tanks had official designations partly using Iroha ordering, such as Chi-ha (ha meaning the third model). Other examples include subsection ordering in documents, seat numbering in theaters, and showing go moves in diagrams (kifu).

Current uses
The Iroha sequence is still used today in many areas with long traditions. Most notably, Japanese laws and regulations officially use Iroha for lower-level subsection ordering purposes, for example  (Article 49, Section 2, Subsection 1-ro). In official translation to English, i, ro, ha... are replaced by a, b, c... as in 49(2)(i)(b).

In music, the notes of an octave are named i ro ha ni ho he to, written in katakana.

Iroha is also used in numbering the classes of the conventional train cars of Japanese National Railways (now known as JR). I is first class (no longer used), Ro is second class (now "Green car") and Ha is third class (standard carriages).

Some Japanese expressions are only understandable when one has knowledge of the Iroha. The word iroha (often in katakana) itself can mean "the basics" in Japanese, comparable to the term "the ABCs" in English. Similarly,  Iroha no i means "the most basic element of all". I no ichiban ("number one of i") means "the very first".

Iroha karuta, a traditional card game, is still sold as an educational toy.

Irohazaka, a one-way switchback mountain road in Nikkō, Tochigi, is named for the poem because it has 48 corners. The route was popular with Buddhist pilgrims on their way to Lake Chūzenji, which is at the top of the forested hill that this road climbs. While the narrow road has been modernized over the years, care has been taken to keep the number of curves constant.

Origin 
Authorship is traditionally ascribed to the Heian era Japanese Buddhist priest and scholar Kūkai (774–835).  However, this is unlikely as it is believed that in his time there were separate e sounds in the a and ya columns of the kana table. The  (e) above would have been pronounced ye, making the pangram incomplete.

It is said that the Iroha is a transformation of these verses in the Nirvana Sutra:

諸行無常
是生滅法
生滅滅已
寂滅為楽

which translates into

The above in Japanese is read

Shogyō mujō
Ze shōmeppō
Shōmetsu metsui
Jakumetsu iraku

See also 
 Ametsuchi no Uta (an earlier pangram)
 Japanese literature

Other languages 
 Abecedarius
 Alphabet song
 Shiva Sutra, Sanskrit poem with similar function
 Hanacaraka, the traditional arrangement of the letters of the Javanese alphabet
 Thousand Character Classic, Chinese poem with similar function, especially used in Korea

Notes

References

Japanese poems
Japanese writing system
Collation
Articles containing Japanese poems
Constrained writing
Pangrams
Buddhist poetry